Catherine Esther Doust (born 27 May 1962) is an Australian politician who has been a Labor Party member of the Legislative Council of Western Australia since 2001, representing South Metropolitan Region. She was  President of the Legislative Council from 2017 to 2021, the first woman to hold the position.

Early life
Doust was born in Kalgoorlie and attended the University of Western Australia, graduating with a Bachelor of Arts degree. From 1984, she worked as an official with the Shop, Distributive and Allied Employees Association, including as a board member and treasurer for periods. She also served as a vice-president of UnionsWA.

Political career
Doust entered parliament at the 2001 state election, standing in the second position on Labor's ticket in South Metropolitan Region. She was made deputy chairman of committees in the Legislative Council shortly after being elected, and after the 2005 state election was made a parliamentary secretary, holding that position in the ministries of Geoff Gallop and Alan Carpenter. Doust was elected deputy leader of the Labor Party in the Legislative Council after the 2008 state election. She has served in the shadow cabinet under both Eric Ripper and Mark McGowan. Doust's husband, Bill Johnston, is also a member of parliament, although they were married years before either of them were elected.

Doust was elected President of the Legislative Council on 23 May 2017, in doing so becoming the first female President of the Council in history. Doust was controversially replaced on 24 May 2021 due to long standing disagreements with Premier Mark McGowan particularly regarding a corruption probe into former Liberal MP Phil Edman.

See also
 Women in the Western Australian Legislative Council

References

1962 births
Living people
Australian Labor Party members of the Parliament of Western Australia
Labor Right politicians
Australian trade unionists
Members of the Western Australian Legislative Council
Presidents of the Western Australian Legislative Council
People from Kalgoorlie
University of Western Australia alumni
21st-century Australian politicians
21st-century Australian women politicians
Women members of the Western Australian Legislative Council